A cylinder has traditionally been a three-dimensional solid, one of the most basic of curvilinear geometric shapes. In elementary geometry, it is considered a prism with a circle as its base.

A cylinder may also be defined as an infinite curvilinear surface in various modern branches of geometry and topology. The shift in the basic meaning—solid versus surface (as in ball and sphere)—has created some ambiguity with terminology. The two concepts may be distinguished by referring to solid cylinders and cylindrical surfaces. In the literature the unadorned term cylinder could refer to either of these or to an even more specialized object, the right circular cylinder.

Types
The definitions and results in this section are taken from the 1913 text Plane and Solid Geometry by George Wentworth and David Eugene Smith .

A  is a surface consisting of all the points on all the lines which are parallel to a given line and which pass through a fixed plane curve in a plane not parallel to the given line. Any line in this family of parallel lines is called an element of the cylindrical surface. From a kinematics point of view, given a plane curve, called the directrix, a cylindrical surface is that surface traced out by a line, called the generatrix, not in the plane of the directrix, moving parallel to itself and always passing through the directrix. Any particular position of the generatrix is an element of the cylindrical surface.

A solid bounded by a cylindrical surface and two parallel planes is called a (solid) . The line segments determined by an element of the cylindrical surface between the two parallel planes is called an element of the cylinder. All the elements of a cylinder have equal lengths. The two bases of a cylinder are congruent figures. In some elementary treatments, a cylinder always means a circular cylinder.

The  (or altitude) of a cylinder is the perpendicular distance between its bases.

A cylinder of revolution is a right circular cylinder. The height of a cylinder of revolution is the length of the generating line segment.

Right circular cylinders

The bare term cylinder often refers to a solid cylinder with circular ends perpendicular to the axis, that is, a right circular cylinder, as shown in the figure. The formulae for the surface area and the volume of a right circular cylinder have been known from early antiquity.

A right circular cylinder can also be thought of as the solid of revolution generated by rotating a rectangle about one of its sides. These cylinders are used in an integration technique (the "disk method") for obtaining volumes of solids of revolution.

A tall and thin needle cylinder has a height much greater than its diameter, whereas a short and wide disk cylinder has a diameter much greater than its height.

Properties

Cylindric sections

A cylindric section is the intersection of a cylinder's surface with a plane. They are, in general, curves and are special types of plane sections. The cylindric section by a plane that contains two elements of a cylinder is a parallelogram. Such a cylindric section of a right cylinder is a rectangle.

If a right section of a cylinder is a circle then the cylinder is a circular cylinder. In more generality, if a right section of a cylinder is a conic section (parabola, ellipse, hyperbola) then the solid cylinder is said to be parabolic, elliptic and hyperbolic, respectively.  

For a right circular cylinder, there are several ways in which planes can meet a cylinder. First, planes that intersect a base in at most one point. A plane is tangent to the cylinder if it meets the cylinder in a single element.  The right sections are circles and all other planes intersect the cylindrical surface in an ellipse. If a plane intersects a base of the cylinder in exactly two points then the line segment joining these points is part of the cylindric section. If such a plane contains two elements, it has a rectangle as a cylindric section, otherwise the sides of the cylindric section are portions of an ellipse. Finally, if a plane contains more than two points of a base, it contains the entire base and the cylindric section is a circle.

In the case of a right circular cylinder with a cylindric section that is an ellipse, the eccentricity  of the cylindric section and semi-major axis  of the cylindric section depend on the radius of the cylinder  and the angle  between the secant plane and cylinder axis, in the following way:

Volume
If the base of a circular cylinder has a radius   and the cylinder has height , then its volume is given by

.

This formula holds whether or not the cylinder is a right cylinder.

This formula may be established by using Cavalieri's principle.

In more generality, by the same principle, the volume of any cylinder is the product of the area of a base and the height. For example, an elliptic cylinder with a base having semi-major axis , semi-minor axis  and height  has a volume , where  is the area of the base ellipse (= ). This result for right elliptic cylinders can also be obtained by integration, where the axis of the cylinder is taken as the positive -axis and  the area of each elliptic cross-section, thus:

Using cylindrical coordinates, the volume of a right circular cylinder can be calculated by integration over

Surface area
Having radius  and altitude (height) , the surface area of a right circular cylinder, oriented so that its axis is vertical, consists of three parts:
 
 the area of the top base: 
 the area of the bottom base: 
 the area of the side: 

The area of the top and bottom bases is the same, and is called the base area, .

An open cylinder does not include either top or bottom elements, and therefore has surface area (lateral area)
.

The surface area of the solid right circular cylinder is made up the sum of all three components: top, bottom and side. Its surface area is therefore,
,
where  is the diameter of the circular top or bottom.

For a given volume, the right circular cylinder with the smallest surface area has . Equivalently, for a given surface area, the right circular cylinder with the largest volume has , that is, the cylinder fits snugly in a cube of side length = altitude ( = diameter of base circle).

The lateral area, of a circular cylinder, which need not be a right cylinder, is more generally given by:
,
This produces the previous formula for lateral area when the cylinder is a right circular cylinder.

Right circular hollow cylinder (cylindrical shell)

A right circular hollow cylinder (or ) is a three-dimensional region bounded by two right circular cylinders having the same axis and two parallel annular bases perpendicular to the cylinders' common axis, as in the diagram.

Let the height be , internal radius , and external radius .  The volume is given by

.

Thus, the volume of a cylindrical shell equals 2(average radius)(altitude)(thickness).

The surface area, including the top and bottom, is given by

.

Cylindrical shells are used in a common integration technique for finding volumes of solids of revolution.

On the Sphere and Cylinder

In the treatise by this name, written c. 225 BCE, Archimedes obtained the result of which he was most proud, namely obtaining the formulas for the volume and surface area of a sphere by exploiting the relationship between a sphere and its circumscribed right circular cylinder of the same height and diameter. The sphere has a volume  that of the circumscribed cylinder and a surface area   that of the cylinder (including the bases). Since the values for the cylinder were already known, he obtained, for the first time, the corresponding values for the sphere. A sculpted sphere and cylinder were placed on the tomb of Archimedes at his request.

Cylindrical surfaces

In some areas of geometry and topology the term cylinder refers to what has been called a cylindrical surface. A cylinder is defined as a surface consisting of all the points on all the lines which are parallel to a given line and which pass through a fixed plane curve in a plane not parallel to the given line. Through each point of a generalized cylinder there passes a unique line that is contained in the cylinder. Thus, this definition may be rephrased to say that a cylinder is any ruled surface spanned by a one-parameter family of parallel lines.

A cylinder having a right section that is an ellipse, parabola, or hyperbola  is called an elliptic cylinder, parabolic cylinder and hyperbolic cylinder, respectively. These are degenerate quadric surfaces.

When the principal axes of a quadric are aligned with the reference frame (always possible for a quadric), a general equation of the quadric in three dimensions is given by

If at least one variable does not appear in the equation, then the quadric is degenerate. If one variable is missing, we may assume by an appropriate rotation of axes that the variable  does not appear and the general equation of this type of degenerate quadric can be written as

where

Elliptic cylinder 
If  this is the equation of an elliptic cylinder. Further simplification can be obtained by translation of axes and scalar multiplication.

This equation of an elliptic cylinder is a generalization of the equation of the ordinary, circular cylinder. Elliptic cylinders are also known as cylindroids, but that name is ambiguous, as it can also refer to the Plücker conoid.

If  has a different sign than the coefficients, we obtain the imaginary elliptic cylinders:

which have no real points on them. ( gives a single real point.)

Hyperbolic cylinder 

Parabolic cylinder 

Projective geometry
In projective geometry, a cylinder is simply a cone whose apex (vertex) lies on the plane at infinity. If the cone is a quadratic cone, the plane at infinity (which passes through the vertex) can intersect the cone at two real lines, a single real line (actually a coincident pair of lines), or only at the vertex. These cases give rise to the hyperbolic, parabolic or elliptic cylinders respectively.

This concept is useful when considering degenerate conics, which may include the cylindrical conics.

Prisms

A solid circular cylinder can be seen as the limiting case of a -gonal prism where  approaches infinity. The connection is very strong and many older texts treat prisms and cylinders simultaneously. Formulas for surface area and volume are derived from the corresponding formulas for prisms by using inscribed and circumscribed prisms and then letting the number of sides of the prism increase without bound. One reason for the early emphasis (and sometimes exclusive treatment) on circular cylinders is that a circular base is the only type of geometric figure for which this technique works with the use of only elementary considerations (no appeal to calculus or more advanced mathematics). Terminology about prisms and cylinders is identical. Thus, for example, since a truncated prism is a prism whose bases do not lie in parallel planes, a solid cylinder whose bases do not lie in parallel planes would be called a truncated cylinder.

From a polyhedral viewpoint, a cylinder can also be seen as a dual of a bicone as an infinite-sided bipyramid.

See also
List of shapes
Steinmetz solid, the intersection of two or three perpendicular cylinders

Notes

References

External links

 
Surface area of a cylinder at MATHguide
Volume of a cylinder at MATHguide

Quadrics
Elementary shapes
Euclidean solid geometry
Surfaces